Max Slevogt (8 October 1868 – 20 September 1932) was a German Impressionist painter and illustrator, best known for his landscapes. He was, together with Lovis Corinth and Max Liebermann,  one of the foremost representatives in Germany of the plein air style.

Biography

He was born in Landshut, Germany, in 1868. From 1885 to 1889 he studied at the Munich Academy, and his early paintings are dark in tone, exemplifying the prevailing style in Munich. In 1889 Slevogt visited Paris, where he attended the Académie Julian.  In 1896, he drew caricatures for the  magazines Simplicissimus and Jugend, and the next year he had his first solo exhibition in Vienna.

Toward the end of the 1890s his palette brightened. He travelled again to Paris in 1900, where he was represented in the German pavilion of the world exhibition with the work Scheherezade, and was greatly impressed by the paintings of Édouard Manet. In 1901 he joined the Berlin Secession.

A trip to Egypt in 1914 resulted in 21 oil paintings in a fresh bright style, as well as numerous watercolors and drawings; on the return journey he stopped off in Italy. In June he acquired the country seat Neukastel.
After the outbreak of World War I he was sent as official war painter to the western front. The war experience brought about a search for new style appropriate to the expression of the horrors of war. In the same year he became a member of the Prussian Academy of Arts in Berlin.

He designed scenery for the performance of  Mozart's Don Giovanni in the Dresdner state opera in 1924. His work was part of the painting event in the art competition at the 1928 Summer Olympics. In 1929 he was given a large 60th birthday exhibition in the Prussian academy of the arts in Berlin. During the last year of his life he worked on the religious mural Golgatha in the peace church in Ludwigshafen on the Rhine. It was destroyed by bombing raids during World War II.

Max Slevogt died in Leinsweiler (at that time in the Rheinpfalz part of Bavaria) in 1932. He is buried in the burial place of the family Finkler east of his house, the so-called Slevogthof (with wall paintings) at Neukastel.

Restitutions of artworks 
In 2020 the Saarland Cultural Heritage Foundation announced the return of the following Max Slevogt works to the heirs of Julius Freund, whose family was racially persecuted as Jews after 30 January 1933 and forced to sell under the Nazis.

 Francisco d'Andrade (Head Study), 1902, oil on canvas.
 The Port of Brindisi, 1914, watercolor
 Li-Hung-Tschang, 1900, ink drawing
 Scheherezade tells her story to the Caliph, 1901, pen drawing
 Mungos, 1901, watercolor pen drawing
 Lamenting Women (Lamenting Women in front of a House), ca.1898–1903, pen and ink drawing

Selected paintings

References

External links 

 Max Slevogt-Galery Schloss Villa Ludwigshöhe in Edenkoben
 
 works by the artist at "Museumsportal Schleswig-Holstein"
 Slevogthof Neukastel (at Leinsweiler) 
German masters of the nineteenth century: paintings and drawings from the Federal Republic of Germany, a full text exhibition catalog from The Metropolitan Museum of Art, which contains material on Max Slevogt (no. 83–86)
High-resolution images of 'Voyage to Egypt' series

19th-century German painters
19th-century German male artists
German male painters
20th-century German painters
20th-century German male artists
1868 births
1932 deaths
Académie Julian alumni
Impressionist artists
German Impressionist painters
Recipients of the Pour le Mérite (civil class)
Orientalist painters
People from Landshut
Olympic competitors in art competitions